This sortable list of largest libraries includes libraries that, as measured in 2018 or subsequently, store 15 million or more items.

Largest libraries in the world

See also 
 List of largest libraries in the United States

References

Libraries
Largest
Largest libraries
Articles with tables in need of attention